The Ministry of National Defence is the agency of the Guatemalan government responsible for the budget, training and policy of the military of Guatemala. Based in Guatemala City, the Defence Ministry is highly guarded, and the President of Guatemala frequently visits. Prior to 1945 the agency was titled the Secretariat of War (Secretaría de la Guerra).

 the Minister of National Defence is Major General Juan Carlos Alemán Soto.

Structure
The ministry is headed by the Minister of National Defence, who reports to the President of Guatemala, the commander in chief of the armed forces.

List of Ministers of National Defence

See also
Military of Guatemala

References

Sources
 CIA Chiefs Of State
 New York Times archives
 National Security Archives - The Guatemalan Military

External links
 http://www.mindef.mil.gt/

Guatemala
Government of Guatemala
Guatemala, Defence
Military of Guatemala
Defence